Thiéry, Burkina Faso is a town in the Bogandé Department of Gnagna Province in eastern Burkina Faso. The town has a population of 6,224.

References

Populated places in the Est Region (Burkina Faso)
Gnagna Province